The 2020 AFL season was the 124th season of the Australian Football League (AFL), the highest level senior men's Australian rules football competition in Australia, which was known as the Victorian Football League until 1989. The season featured eighteen clubs.

Played during the first year of the COVID-19 pandemic, the season commenced on 19 March and was suspended four days later; it resumed on 11 June and ran until 24 October. A shortened season was played, comprising a 17-game home-and-away season followed by a finals series featuring the top eight clubs; all matches were shortened to 80% of their usual length. Virus outbreaks and interstate travel restrictions precluded games in many states for much of the season, with all clubs spending parts of the season temporarily relocated to quarantine hubs, particularly in South East Queensland where almost half of all matches were played – including the Grand Final, the first time it had been played outside Victoria. Health directives resulted in restricted match attendances throughout the year, including thirty matches played behind closed doors.

The premiership was won by the Richmond Football Club for the 13th time and second time consecutively, after it defeated  by 31 points in the 2020 AFL Grand Final.

Impact of the COVID-19 pandemic

The 2020 season was disrupted by the COVID-19 pandemic, which was formally declared a pandemic by the World Health Organization on 11 March 2020, eight days prior to the scheduled start of the premiership season. Restrictions imposed by the different state governments related to social distancing, lockdowns of non-essential services which lasted for three months across the country, and border controls for interstate and international travel, all had significant effects on the completion of the 2020 season.

Fixture
Prior to the commencement of the season, anticipating that the season would be forced to cease at the peak of the virus, the AFL announced the fixture would be shortened from 22 matches per team to 17, with each team playing each other once and serving one bye.  The season then commenced on 19 March as originally scheduled; but as restrictions, followed by periods of formal quarantine, were introduced on interstate travel, the season was suspended after Round 1.

The season was suspended for more than two months. On 15 May, as most states began easing restrictions, the league's plan to resume the season was announced: clubs began non-contact training from 18 May, and full contact training from 25 May ahead of resuming competitive matches from 11 June, with the revised fixture released gradually throughout the year, and changing regularly and often at short notice when the situation forced it.

The first major fixturing challenge occurred in the aftermath of Round 4, when a spike in Victorian COVID-19 cases prompted other states to either impose tighter quarantine restrictions on Victorians, or defer the relaxation of restrictions already in place. Although this forced two planned Round 5 matches - ( vs  and  vs ) - to be redrawn at less than a week's notice (Richmond instead faced Melbourne in Victoria, and Sydney faced West Coast in Queensland), and the entire planned Round 6 and 7 fixtures to be redrawn, the season continued without suspension. The gradual release of the fixture also allowed the flexibility to reschedule any games which were postponed due to positive COVID-19 tests among players or staff.

When games were postponed or rescheduled at short notice, other games within the same round were often also rescheduled to ensure the primetime television slots were filled.

Club medical restrictions
During the peak of the hiatus, players were allowed to train only within the strict limits of the government restrictions on public gatherings; at the height of the pandemic in April and May, when gatherings larger than two were restricted, which meant players could train only in pairs. When the league returned to training and playing, it was done with strict, enforceable protocols and monitoring in place to ensure that the clubs would not suffer a virus outbreak, and that any virus cases could be contained with minimal impact to the wider competition. To this effect, players, umpires and staff were regularly tested for the virus and continued to train mostly in small groups, allowing individual players or small groups to be segregated and contained in the event of positive cases. Players and club personnel were subject to protocols which extended to players' personal lives, which were above and beyond the lockdown guidelines still in place for the general public, in order to protect the AFL season from suffering an outbreak; and families and partners who were part of quarantine hubs came under the same restrictions.

There were many breaches during the season, resulting in fines for the players and clubs involved, or suspensions in the most egregious cases:
's Sydney Stack and Callum Coleman-Jones (ten matches each), for being involved in a fight outside a Surfers Paradise kebab shop in the early hours of 4 September.
's Elijah Taylor (rest of season, which amounted to six home-and-away matches), for bringing his girlfriend into the club's Perth quarantine hotel.
  assistant coach Ben Hart (six training weeks), for allowing training groups to be too close to each other on a quarantine camp in early May.
 's Steele Sidebottom (four matches) and Lynden Dunn (one match), for travelling in an Uber and visiting more than one unauthorised house, the night concluding with Sidebottom being driven home by police.
's Peter Ladhams (three matches) and Dan Houston (two matches), for inviting non-authorised residents to their house.
 's Charlie Spargo (two matches) and Kysaiah Pickett (one match), for travelling via an Uber to an unauthorised house for a gathering.
 's Ollie Wines (one week), for inviting a non-authorised resident to his house.

Throughout the season, AFL-listed players were not permitted to participate in the state league competitions (the VFL, SANFL, WAFL and NEAFL) due to the greater risk of external threats in the semi-professional state league environment; this meant there was no formal competitive reserves football for players who were not selected in the seniors. Clubs based in the same state were permitted to arrange ad hoc scratch matches for their unselected players against each other and in empty stadiums to enable some match practice; these could be stand-alone games or curtain raisers to senior games.

Quarantine hubs and club relocation
Interstate travel restrictions and quarantine periods were a significant impediment to the completion of the season after the resumption, with many state border crossings subject to mandatory 14-day quarantine periods. Western Australia and Tasmania had the tightest restrictions, requiring quarantine for all entries throughout the entire season; South Australia had similar restrictions which were loosened after Round 5. Border crossings around the rest of the country were freer; but, as second waves of virus cases occurred in Victoria (after Round 5) and New South Wales (after Round 10), quarantines were imposed on travellers leaving those states. This precluded a conventional interstate home-and-away fixture, and meant that Queensland – which maintained few virus cases and had the most favourable quarantine arrangements – became critical to the completion of the season.

The border restrictions were managed by requiring several clubs to relocate outside their states; or, to set-up in weeks-long quarantine hubs, in which clubs travelled at the same time to a restricted state for an extended three- or four-week trip, quarantined there and played several games against other teams in the hub. Players' immediate families were permitted to join them at the league's expense, but were subject to the same lifestyle restrictions and virus testing regime as the players.

The relocation of all ten Victorian clubs occurred after Round 5. The relocation of the six New South Wales based clubs (and the four Victorian clubs) to Queensland then occurred after Round 8. These relocations lasted until the end of the season.

The season's first quarantine hub occurred immediately after the resumption, and featured the clubs from South Australia and Western Australia – the most tightly restricted state at that time. The clubs were relocated to south-east Queensland – with the Western Australian teams arriving in Round 2 and the South Australian teams arriving in Round 3 (after their Round 2 Showdown game in Adelaide). The visiting teams played each other and the two Queensland-based clubs in a hub until Round 5. The two West Australian teams remained in the hub for an additional week and flew back to West Australia following Round 6, and the South Australian hub members returned to South Australia after Round 5 but still travelled weekly to Queensland over subsequent weeks.

From that point on, three three-week quarantine hubs were staged in Perth, to allow matches to be played there despite season-long quarantine requirements. Each time, two interstate clubs travelled at once from Queensland, and played each other while in quarantine, then the two Perth clubs while out of quarantine. These hubs were:
Rounds 7–9:  and 
Rounds 12–14:  and 

 and  later returned to a Queensland hub for the final four rounds of the home-and-away season.

Teams could also travel from Queensland to the Northern Territory, where three games were played. However, season-long Tasmanian border restrictions to all states resulted in no AFL matches being played in the state for the first time since 2000.

Border restrictions ultimately also precluded the playing of any finals in Victoria or New South Wales – including the Grand Final – and limited finals in Western Australia to the first week only, since the bye week after Round 18 allowed time to quarantine. For the first three weeks of finals, clubs unable to play in their home states were given the option to nominate a preferred home ground from the Gabba, Metricon Stadium and Adelaide Oval for home finals. On 2 September, the Grand Final was formally scheduled for Saturday 24 October, the latest in the year a Grand Final had been played; it was scheduled at night to avoid a clash with the 100th running of the Cox Plate that afternoon, making it the first Grand Final not to be played in the afternoon timeslot; and, it was scheduled at the Gabba, making it the first AFL Grand Final to be played outside of Melbourne.

The hub arrangements resulted in many other fixturing anomalies. Among the most notable occurred in Round 6, when all nine games were played in New South Wales and Queensland, traditionally rugby league territory. Whole rounds were played with no matches in Melbourne, which had only previously occurred in Round 8, 1952 (the promotional National Day Round). Clubs hosted several fixtured home games at interstate venues, and hub stadiums were sometimes used for multiple games on the same day – the first time this had happened in senior VFL/AFL football since a double-header in Round 19, 1986. The desire to compress the schedule meant that the seven-game Round 10 and six-game Round 15 were played entirely on weekdays, the first time this had happened outside of rounds played on a public holiday.

Crowds
Government restrictions on gatherings meant that, starting in Round 1, crowds were locked out of senior VFL/AFL matches for the first time in the code's history. State governments gradually allowed crowds, often small and restricted in size, into games, starting immediately from the resumption in Round 2 in South Australia and New South Wales, from Round 3 in Queensland, and from football's resumption in Round 7 in Western Australia. The sizes of allowable crowds changed as the season progressed, with early season Queensland and New South Wales crowds limited to only a few hundred, while half-full crowds were allowed in the largely virus-free Western Australia from Round 7.

Starting in Round 2, after the resumption of the season, broadcasters experimented with adding artificial crowd noise to lend a more normal feel to their telecasts to overcome the lack of genuine crowds in stadiums.

All in all, the total attendance for 2020 (1,033,037) was only 13.74% of 2019's unaffected 7,517,677 total. Similarly, due to the shortened season, the average attendance of 6,377 per game was 17.56% of the 2019 season's average of 36,317.

Rule changes
Throughout the season, matches were played for a shortened length of 16 minutes plus time on per quarter, instead of 20 minutes plus time on. This was originally done at the start of the season, in the hope that playing shorter games could facilitate more frequent games than weekly, maximising the games which could be played before the anticipated suspension of the season; but this did not eventuate, since the season was suspended after only one round. It was then retained after the resumption to lighten the load on players to take account for the compromised training schedule; and, to allow make-up games to be more easily scheduled between rounds when matches were postponed or refixtured. As a direct result of this, it was a very low-scoring season, and several records or long-standing marks in low scoring were set during the season.

Financials
When the season was suspended, the league and clubs were faced with an acute cash-flow shortage, as the gate and broadcast revenues which had been budgeted for stopped immediately; clubs deriving revenues from gaming and other public venues also saw those revenues drop when public gatherings were restricted. The league and clubs all stood down or severely reduced hours for huge percentages of their staff during the suspension; furthermore, the AFL agreed with both the AFLPA and ALFUA to enact significant play cuts for the players and umpires for the season, amounting to 50% of their wage from the point of the suspension until the end of the season, and increasing to 70% for any period of suspension which extends beyond the end of May. The league successfully obtained a $500–600 million line of credit with the National Australia Bank and ANZ Bank, leveraged against its ownership of Marvel Stadium, to cover its and its clubs' cash shortfalls during the suspension.

Resuming the season and playing the shortened 17-game season in full, even without crowds, was important to ensure the league still took in most of its television revenue. Prior to the resumption, the league renegotiated its $417-million-per-year broadcast deals with the Seven Network and Foxtel, ultimately resulting in a total television revenue reduction of approximately $150 million over 2020–2022. On top of this, the cost of running the Queensland hubs, including medical costs for ongoing COVID-19 testing, resulted in a $60 million expense for the league.

The overall financial losses for the league in the 2020 season, compared with the budgeted results prior to the pandemic, were less than but in the order of $100 million – a substantially better result than the $1 billion loss which was feared as a worst-case scenario when the season was originally suspended.

Other effects
Among the other direct impacts of the pandemic were:
  and  did not play a match at Jiangwan Stadium in Shanghai, China, as scheduled as part of the original Round 11 – this decision was made prior to the season while the virus was still mostly prevalent only within China and prior to its spread in Australia, but would eventually have been mandated by restrictions on international travel.
The two-Test international rules football series against Ireland, planned to have been played in Ireland in November, were cancelled.

Pre-season

Marsh Community Series

The pre-season series of games returned as the 2020 Marsh Community Series, with teams playing two games each. The games were stand-alone, with no overall winner of the series. Each team played two games, many at suburban or regional venues, while all games were televised on Fox Footy.

State of Origin for Bushfire Relief Match

A one-off benefit match was played on 28 February 2020, as a fundraiser for the relief effort for the 2019–20 Australian bushfire season. The league donated $2.5 million to disaster relief funds in association with the match. Selection for the two teams was under state of origin rules, and it was the first interstate representative match featuring AFL-listed players since the AFL Hall of Fame Tribute Match held in 2008. Played prior to the pandemic's spread to Australia, it was the highest-attended football match of the year.

Premiership season

As the coronavirus situation developed, only the first round was played as originally drawn. The rest of the fixture was redrawn into a new seventeen-round season in which each team played each other once. The new rescheduled fixture was released gradually through the season, often at short notice, to allow the fixture to respond to developments in the spread of the virus.

Round 1

Round 2

Round 3

Round 4

Round 5

Round 6

Round 7

Round 8

Round 9

Round 10

Round 11

Round 12

Round 13

Report
Report
Report
Report
Report
Report
Report
Report

Round 14

Round 15

Round 16

Round 17

Round 18

Report
 Report
 Report

Season notes
 qualified for the finals for the first time since 2011.
 "won" its first wooden spoon.
 won its fourth McClelland Trophy as the minor premiers and its first since 2004. They also finished on top of the ladder at the end of every round.

Win/loss table

Bold – Home game
X – Bye
Opponent for round listed above margin

Ladder

Ladder progression
Numbers highlighted in green indicates the team finished the round inside the top 8.
Numbers highlighted in blue indicates the team finished in first place on the ladder in that round.
Numbers highlighted in red indicates the team finished in last place on the ladder in that round.
Underlined numbers indicates the team did not play during that round, either due to a bye or a postponed game.
Subscript numbers indicate ladder position at round's end.

Positions of teams round by round

Finals series

Week one

Week two

Week three

Week four

Attendance

By club
In this table, home matches which were played behind closed doors are not included in the total count of home games, and therefore do not contribute to the home average.

Club leadership

Awards

Coleman Medal

Player milestones

Best and fairest

Coach changes

References

 
Australian Football League seasons
2020 in Australian rules football
AFL season 2020
AFL season 2020